Larry Willoughby (February 24, 1950 – January 14, 2021) was an American country music singer-songwriter and the vice president of A&R at Capitol Records.

Biography
Willoughby's debut album, Building Bridges, was released in 1984 by Atlantic America. Three singles were released from the album, including the title track, which was Willoughby's only single to reach the Top 60 of the Billboard Hot Country Singles chart. It was covered in 2006 by Brooks & Dunn, whose version peaked at No. 4. Another single from the album, "Heart on the Line (Operator, Operator)," was covered by Eddy Raven as "Operator, Operator" and reached the country Top 10 in 1985. Willoughby's songs have also been recorded by The Oak Ridge Boys, Waylon Jennings, and his cousin Rodney Crowell, who produced Willoughby's album.

Willoughby had Alzheimer's disease. He died in Sherman, Texas, at the age of 70, after contracting COVID-19 during the COVID-19 pandemic in Texas.

Discography

Albums

Singles

Books
 Texas Rhythm, Texas Rhyme: A Pictorial History of Texas Music
 Texas, Our Texas

References

External links
 [ Larry Willoughby] at Allmusic
 

1950 births
2021 deaths
People from Sherman, Texas
American country singer-songwriters
American male singer-songwriters
Atlantic Records artists
Singer-songwriters from Texas
Country musicians from Texas
Deaths from the COVID-19 pandemic in Texas